Big Bad John is a 1990 American Western film directed by Burt Kennedy. It stars Ned Beatty and Jimmy Dean, the latter of whom wrote and performed the song the film is based upon.

Cast
 Ned Beatty as Charlie Mitchelle
 Jimmy Dean as Cletus Morgan
 Jack Elam as Jake Calhoun
 Doug English as John "Big Bad John" Tyler
 Bo Hopkins as Lester
 Romy Windsor as Marie Mitchelle
 Jeff Osterhage as Alvin Mahoney
 Ned Vaughn as Billy Mahoney
 Buck Taylor as Bob Simmons
 Amzie Strickland as Nellie
 Jerry Potter as Blany
 Red Steagall as Monahan
 Dan Kamin as Jacque (as Dan Kamin)
 Anne Lockhart as Lady Police Officer

References

External links
 

1990 films
1990 Western (genre) films
American Western (genre) films
Films based on songs
Films directed by Burt Kennedy
Films set in Colorado
Films shot in Colorado
Films shot in New Mexico
Films shot in Texas
Neo-Western films
1990s English-language films
1990s American films